Guinea-Bissau is divided into eight regions and one autonomous sector. These, in turn are subdivided into 37 sectors (singular: setor, plural: setores) ; which are further subdivided into smaller groups called sections (singular: secção, plural: secções); which are further subdivided into populated places (i.e.: towns, villages, localities, settlements, communities, etc.). Here are the following listed below:

Regions

References 

 
Guinea-Bissau
Guinea Bissau